The 2010 NFL season was the 91st regular season of the National Football League (NFL) and the 45th of the Super Bowl era.

The regular season began with the NFL Kickoff game on NBC on Thursday, September 9, at the Louisiana Superdome as the New Orleans Saints, the Super Bowl XLIV champions, defeated the Minnesota Vikings.

Tom Brady, quarterback of the New England Patriots, was named NFL MVP for the 2010 season. In Super Bowl XLV, the league's championship game played at Cowboys Stadium in Arlington, Texas, the Green Bay Packers defeated the Pittsburgh Steelers to win their fourth Super Bowl, spoiling the Steelers' chance for a seventh title. This season also marked the first full-length season in which a team with a losing record made the playoffs, when the Seattle Seahawks won the NFC West with a 7–9 record, after defeating the St. Louis Rams in Week 17 to clinch the division title. One week later, the Seahawks dethroned the defending champion New Orleans Saints in the wild-card round, to become the first ever sub-.500 playoff team to win a postseason game.

This season marked the last time a game was played on a Tuesday night until .

Labor issues
NFL owners voted in 2008 to opt out of their collective bargaining agreement (CBA) with the National Football League Players Association (NFLPA) as of the end of the 2010 season. (The vote was 23 in favor, 9 against; the extension measure needed 24 to pass, which would have set the CBA to expire after the 2012 season). Since a new CBA was not reached with the NFLPA, 2010 was an uncapped season, meaning that there was no salary cap or salary floor between which teams had to operate. Also, the uncapped season limited unrestricted free agency only to players with at least six years of experience, as opposed to four under a capped season. The final eight teams alive in the 2009–10 NFL playoffs (Arizona, Dallas, Minnesota and New Orleans in the NFC; and Baltimore, Indianapolis, the New York Jets and San Diego in the AFC) were restricted in the free agents they could sign.

The issue of a CBA continued into the 2011 NFL season, affecting most of the off-season.

Player movement
Free agency began on March 5, 2010.

Free agency
Notable players to change teams during free agency included:

Quarterbacks Derek Anderson (Cleveland to Arizona), David Carr (N.Y. Giants to San Francisco), Jake Delhomme (Carolina to Cleveland) and Matt Leinart (Arizona to Houston). 
Running backs Thomas Jones (N.Y. Jets to Kansas City), Chester Taylor (Minnesota to Chicago), LaDainian Tomlinson (San Diego to N.Y. Jets) and Brian Westbrook (Philadelphia to San Francisco).
Wide receivers Nate Burleson (Seattle to Detroit), TJ Houshmandzadeh (Seattle to Baltimore) and Terrell Owens (Buffalo to Cincinnati).
Tight ends Chris Baker (New England to Seattle), Alge Crumpler (Tennessee to New England), Brandon Manumaleuna (San Diego to Chicago) and Ben Watson (New England to Cleveland).
Offensive tackles Flozell Adams (Dallas to Pittsburgh), Shawn Andrews (Philadelphia to N.Y. Giants), Cornell Green (Oakland to Buffalo) and Artis Hicks (Minnesota to Washington).
Guards Alan Faneca (N.Y. Jets to Arizona), Rex Hadnot (Cleveland to Arizona) and Wade Smith (Kansas City to Houston).
Defensive ends Alex Brown (Chicago to New Orleans), Aaron Kampman (Green Bay to Jacksonville), Julius Peppers (Carolina to Chicago), Jason Taylor (Miami to N.Y. Jets) and Kyle Vanden Bosch (Tennessee to Detroit).
Defensive tackles Dwan Edwards (Baltimore to Buffalo), John Henderson (Jacksonville to Oakland), Ma'ake Kemoeatu (Carolina to Washington), Cory Redding (Seattle to Baltimore) and Jamal Williams (San Diego to Denver).
Linebackers Karlos Dansby (Arizona to Miami), Larry Foote (Detroit to Pittsburgh), Scott Fujita (New Orleans to Cleveland), Joey Porter (Miami to Arizona) and Will Witherspoon (Philadelphia to Tennessee).
Cornerbacks Phillip Buchanon (Detroit to Washington), Marlin Jackson (Indianapolis to Philadelphia), Tim Jennings (Indianapolis to Chicago), Nate Jones (Miami to Denver), Dunta Robinson (Houston to Atlanta) and Lito Sheppard (N.Y. Jets to Minnesota).
Safeties Brodney Pool (Cleveland to N.Y. Jets) and Antrel Rolle (Arizona to N.Y. Giants).

Trades

The following notable trades were made during the 2010 league year:

 March 5: Arizona traded WR Anquan Boldin to Baltimore in exchange for Baltimore's third- and fourth-round selections in the 2010 NFL draft;
 March 5: San Diego traded CB Antonio Cromartie to the N.Y. Jets in exchange for the Jets' second-round selection in 2011;
 March 6: N.Y. Jets traded S Kerry Rhodes to Arizona in exchange for Arizona's fourth-round selection in 2010 and seventh-round selection in 2011;
 March 8: Atlanta traded CB Chris Houston to Detroit in exchange for a sixth-round selection in 2010 and conditional seventh-round selection in 2011;
 March 14: Cleveland traded DE Kamerion Wimbley to Oakland in exchange for a third-round selection in 2010;
 March 14: Cleveland traded QB Brady Quinn to Denver in exchange for RB Peyton Hillis and a sixth-round selection in 2011;
 March 16: Seattle traded DE Darryl Tapp to Philadelphia in exchange for DE Chris Clemons and a fourth-round selection in 2010;
 March 17: San Diego traded QB Charlie Whitehurst to Seattle in return for a swap of second-round selections in 2010;
 April 2: Philadelphia traded CB Sheldon Brown and LB Chris Gocong to Cleveland in exchange for DE Alex Hall and fourth- and fifth-round selections in 2010;
 April 4: Philadelphia traded QB Donovan McNabb to Washington in exchange for a second-round selection in 2010 and conditional third- or fourth-round selection in 2011;
 April 4: Pittsburgh traded CB Bryant McFadden to Arizona in exchange for a swap of fifth and sixth-round selections in 2010;
 April 5: Seattle traded G Rob Sims and a seventh-round selection to Detroit in exchange for DE Robert Henderson and a fifth-round selection in 2010;
 April 12: Pittsburgh traded WR Santonio Holmes to N.Y. Jets in exchange for a fifth-round selection in 2010;
 April 14: Denver traded WR Brandon Marshall to Miami in exchange for Miami's second-round selections in 2010 and 2011;
 April 16: Miami traded Ted Ginn Jr. to San Francisco in exchange for a fifth-round selection;
 April 19: in a three-way trade, Denver traded TE Tony Scheffler to Detroit, Detroit traded LB Ernie Sims to Philadelphia, Philadelphia sent its fifth-round selection in 2010 to Denver and Denver sent its seventh-round selection to Detroit;
 April 20: Tampa Bay traded QB Byron Leftwich to Pittsburgh in exchange for a seventh-round selection in 2010;
 April 21: St. Louis traded DT Adam Carriker to Washington in exchange for fifth- and seventh-round selections;
 April 24: Washington traded QB Jason Campbell to Oakland in exchange for a fourth-round selection in 2012;
 April 24: Tennessee traded RB LenDale White and DE Kevin Vickerson to Seattle in exchange for a fourth-round selection and swap of sixth-round selections in 2010;
 April 24: Oakland traded LB Kirk Morrison to Jacksonville in exchange for a swap of fourth- and fifth-round selections;
 May 10: Dallas traded LB Bobby Carpenter to St. Louis in exchange for OT Alex Barron;
 June 21: New Orleans traded OT Jammal Brown to Washington in exchange for a swap of third- and fourth-round selections in 2010;
 August 31: Seattle traded CB Josh Wilson to Baltimore for a conditional third- or fourth-round selections in 2011;
 September 4: Denver traded CB Alphonso Smith to Detroit in exchange for TE Dan Gronkowski;
 September 15: New England traded RB Laurence Maroney and a sixth-round selection in 2011 to Denver in exchange for a fourth-round selection;
 October 5: Buffalo traded RB Marshawn Lynch to Seattle in exchange for a fourth-round selection in 2011 and a conditional pick in 2012;
 October 6: New England traded WR Randy Moss and a seventh-round selection in 2012 to Minnesota in exchange for a third-round selection in 2011 and a seventh-round selection in 2012; 
 October 11: Seattle traded WR Deion Branch to New England in exchange for a fourth-round selection in 2011;
 October 19: Kansas City traded DE Alex Magee to Tampa Bay in exchange for a fifth-round selection in 2011.

Draft

The league's 75th annual selection meeting, more commonly known as the NFL Draft, took place at Radio City Music Hall in New York City from April 22–24, the first time that the draft was held over three days instead of the usual two. In the draft with the first overall pick, the St. Louis Rams chose quarterback Sam Bradford from the University of Oklahoma.

Officiating changes
Mike Pereira resigned as the league's Vice President of Officiating. He had led the NFL's officiating since 2001. Carl Johnson was named as Pereira's successor.

Clete Blakeman was promoted to referee, and Don Carey returned to his back judge position.

Rule changes
The following rule changes were passed at the league's annual owners meeting in March:
 The overtime procedure for postseason games has changed. Instead of a straight sudden death, the game will not immediately end if the team that receives the ball first only scores a field goal on its first possession (they can still win the game if they score a touchdown and the game ends if the defense scores a safety). Instead, the other team gets a possession. If the second team on offense then scores a touchdown, it is declared the winner. If the score is tied after both teams had a possession, either by both teams scoring a field goal or by neither team scoring, then it goes back to sudden death. These changes were passed in response to recent statistics that show that since 1994, teams that win the coin toss have won overtime 59.8 percent of the time, and won 34.4 percent of the time on the first possession on a field goal. This included the 2009 NFC Championship Game between the Minnesota Vikings and the New Orleans Saints where the Saints won the overtime coin toss and scored a field goal on their first possession to win the game. In May, the league decided against applying these overtime rule changes to regular season games as well, although they eventually instituted the new overtime rules in the regular season starting in 2012. As all of the 2010–11 playoff games ended in regulation for the first time since 2005–06, the new rule was not needed during its first year of use.  The first game that used this rule was a 2011–12 playoff game between the Pittsburgh Steelers and the Denver Broncos, however the Broncos scored a game-winning touchdown on the first play from scrimmage of the overtime period.
 The definition of a "defenseless receiver" (where a receiver cannot be hit in the head or neck area by an opponent who launches himself and makes contact with his helmet, shoulder, or forearm) will now apply to every defenseless player.
 A play will now immediately be whistled dead once a ball carrier's helmet is knocked off.
 The position of the umpire has been moved from behind the defensive linebackers (except in the last two minutes of the first half, the last five minutes of the second half/overtime, and anytime the offense is inside the defense's five-yard-line) to the offensive backfield opposite the throwing arm of the quarterback in order to reduce the numerous times that the official has been run over during plays.
 During field goal and extra point attempts, defenders cannot line up directly across from the long snapper.
 Dead ball 15-yard personal fouls that are committed on the final play of either the second or fourth quarters will be assessed on the second half or overtime kickoff, respectively. Previously, such penalties during those situations were not enforced.
 Punt returners who make a fair catch signal but then muff the ball are entitled with the opportunity to catch the ball before it hits the ground without interference. If there is interference during such a scenario, the receiving team is awarded the ball at the spot of the foul, but no penalty yardage is assessed.
 The 2009 temporary modification to the rules regarding balls in play that strike an object such as a video board or a guide wire has been made permanent. Prior to 2009, only the down was replayed. The 2009 modification added resetting the game clock to the time when the original play was snapped. This amendment was originally passed in response to a punt hitting the center-hung video display boards of Cowboys Stadium during a 2009 pre-season game.
 The replay system will now also be allowed to cover whether there was some sort of interference with the ball during a play.
 If the clock is stopped in the final minute of either half for a replay review, but would not have stopped without the review, there will be a 10-second runoff (similar to when the offensive team commits a penalty inside of one minute in order to preserve time). As with any other 10-second runoff, either team may take a time-out in lieu of the runoff.

Crowd noise
The NFL relaxed all rules regarding crowd noise, citing the need to increase the in-stadium experience to lure more fans to attend games. In addition, the league cited the advances in the coach-to-quarterback radio communications, and more visiting teams using silent snap counts as an alternative to overcome crowd noise.

The NFL's rules to "legislate the fans", and help visiting offensive players hear the snap count, have been controversial from the start. In one notorious example, then-Cincinnati Bengals head coach Sam Wyche and then-quarterback Boomer Esiason "protested" the crowd noise rules during a 1989 nationally televised preseason game against the New Orleans Saints by constantly complaining to the referee about the loud crowd noise inside the Superdome.

The league will still allow stadiums to post visual noise meters and other scoreboard messages to incite fans to make noise, but they must cease when the play clock is down to 15 seconds. However, home teams are still prohibited from pumping in artificial crowd noise.

Crackdown on illegal hits
After several violent hits throughout the NFL made the news in Week 3, the league announced that it would consider suspending players for illegal hits, such as helmet-to-helmet hits or other blows to the head. (Previously, players could only be fined for such hits.) The league also instructed all officials and referees to have an even higher level of attention toward flagrant hits. Game officials were also instructed to err on the side of safety, and throw flags even when in doubt.

The crackdown has been controversial. Many defensive players have complained that the league is being too strict in their interpretation of what constitutes an "illegal hit", and that it forces them to behave significantly differently from how they were taught to play the game. Another concern is the league's instructions to game officials to err on the side of caution, since questionable calls late in close games significantly affect their outcome. However, the medical community has supported the move, believing that it will help reduce concussions and other head injuries.

The league did not end up suspending any players for violent or illegal hits, however several players were fined for these types of hits within the first few weeks of the crackdown.

2010 deaths
Gaines Adams: Having played for the Tampa Bay Buccaneers and Chicago Bears, Adams died on January 17, 2010.
Elijah Alexander: Selected by the Tampa Bay Buccaneers in the 1992 NFL Draft, he died on March 24, 2010.
Bruce Alford Sr.: Selected by the Philadelphia Eagles in the 1943 NFL Draft and later an official for 20 seasons (1960-79), he died on May 8, 2010.
Johnny Bailey: A former competitor with the Chicago Bears, Bailey died on August 20, 2010, of pancreatic cancer.
Tom Brookshier: A member of the Philadelphia Eagles 1960 NFL championship team, Brookshier died of cancer at Lankenau Medical Center on January 29, 2010. The Broadcast Pioneers of Philadelphia  inducted Brookshier into their Hall of Fame in 2007.

Pro Football Hall of Fame
George Blanda: A member of the Oakland Raiders 1967 AFL championship team, Blanda died after a "short illness" on September 27, 2010. He was 83 years old. A moment of silence was held in Blanda's honor prior to the start of the September 27, 2010, game between the Green Bay Packers and the Chicago Bears on Monday Night Football, from Soldier Field.
Merlin Olsen: Having played from (1962–1976) for the Los Angeles Rams of the National Football League, Olsen died on March 11, 2010, at City of Hope National Medical Center in Duarte, California, at the age of 69.

Preseason
The Pro Football Hall of Fame Game was held on Sunday, August 8, 2010, at 8:00 pm EDT on NBC, with the Dallas Cowboys defeating the Cincinnati Bengals, 16–7 at Fawcett Stadium in Canton, Ohio. The remainder of the preseason game matchups were announced March 31, 2010. Highlights, among others, include the New York Giants and New York Jets facing off in the first-ever game at New Meadowlands Stadium on ESPN. The preseason game in the Bills Toronto Series featured the host Bills defeating the Indianapolis Colts in Toronto on Thursday, August 19 by a score of 34–21. Exact dates and times for most games were announced in April, shortly after the regular season games were announced.

Regular season
Under the original 2002 formula, since the pairings were strictly based on alphabetical order, those teams scheduled to play the entire AFC West had to travel to both Oakland and San Diego in the same season, while those teams playing the entire NFC West had to make their way to both San Francisco and Seattle. In , the New England and New York Jets each had to make cross-country trips to all four of the aforementioned West Coast teams. In an effort to relieve east coast teams from having to travel to the West Coast multiple times during the same season, teams will only have to visit one West Coast team (AFC West or NFC West), plus one western team from the same division closer to the Midwest, under the 2010 modified formula. Specifically, those teams traveling to Oakland (Las Vegas since 2020) will also play at Denver, while those playing at San Diego (Los Angeles since 2017) will also play at Kansas City. For teams scheduled to play the NFC West, those traveling to San Francisco will also go to Arizona, while those scheduled to play in Seattle will then go to St. Louis (this became moot in 2016 when the Rams returned to Los Angeles).

For the 2010 season, the intraconference and interconference matchups are:

Intraconference
 AFC East vs. AFC North
 AFC West vs. AFC South
 NFC East vs. NFC North
 NFC West vs. NFC South

Interconference
 AFC East vs. NFC North
 AFC West vs. NFC West
 AFC North vs. NFC South
 AFC South vs. NFC East

The entire 2010 regular-season schedule was unveiled at 7:00 pm EDT on Tuesday, April 20. Additionally, schedule release shows aired on both the NFL Network and as a SportsCenter special on ESPN2.

Opening weekend 

The NFL Kickoff Game, the first game of the season, took place on Thursday, September 9, starting at 8:35 pm EDT, with the Super Bowl XLIV champion New Orleans hosting the Minnesota, in a rematch of the 2009 NFC Championship Game, with New Orleans winning. Like in previous years, the opening week's prime-time games were expected to be announced at the NFL's annual owners meetings in late March, but that wasn't the case this year, with the schedule announced on April 20.

On March 15, the NFL announced that both the New York Giants and New York Jets would play at home during Week 1 to open New Meadowlands Stadium. The Giants played on Sunday afternoon against Carolina and the Jets opened ESPN's Monday Night Football schedule against Baltimore the next night. For the nightcap, San Diego traveled to play division rival Kansas City, marking the first time that a team from outside the Mountain or Pacific Time Zones has played in, or hosted, the "late" (10:15 pm ET) game.

International play 

The 2010 season featured one International game, played at Wembley Stadium in London. The teams for this game were confirmed on January 15, 2010, with the San Francisco playing host to the Denver on October 31, at 1:00 pm EDT (5:00 pm GMT), with San Francisco winning.

The following week, the third regular-season game of the Bills Toronto Series featured the Buffalo hosting the Chicago at Toronto's Rogers Centre on November 7 at 1 pm EST, marking the first time that the regular-season portion of the series has taken place during the Canadian Football League season and the first time an NFC opponent played in the series.

Sunday Night Football vs. World Series 
On October 31, NBC aired a Sunday Night Football game, Pittsburgh at New Orleans, against Fox's coverage of the Game 4 of the 2010 World Series, a practice the league had traditionally avoided. The Saints won this game 20–10.

Thanksgiving 

As has been the case since , three games were scheduled for Thursday, November 25, with New England at Detroit and New Orleans at Dallas in the traditional afternoon doubleheader, and Cincinnati at the New York Jets in primetime.  New England, New Orleans, and New York won the games.

Christmas 

Christmas Day landed on a Saturday in 2010. The league scheduled one game, Dallas at Arizona that evening, airing on NFL Network.  Arizona won the game.

Week 17: Division games only 
The entire Week 17 schedule, played on January 2, consisted solely of divisional contests, in an attempt to increase competition after several cases over the last few seasons of playoff-bound teams resting their regular starters and playing their reserves. This has continued since then.

Scheduling changes 
 The Philadelphia–Chicago and Tampa Bay–Baltimore games in Week 12 were moved from 1:00 pm EST to 4:15 pm EST.
 The Atlanta–Tampa Bay game in Week 13 was moved from 1:00 pm to 4:15 pm EST.
 The New England–Chicago game in Week 14 was moved from 1:00 pm to 4:15 pm EST
 The Week 14 New York Giants-Minnesota game was changed from Sunday, December 12 at 1:00 pm EST to Monday, December 13 at 8:20 pm EST because of the collapse of the Hubert H. Humphrey Metrodome's roof. (See "Stadiums" below.)
 By way of flexible scheduling, three game times were changed in Week 16: The Minnesota–Philadelphia game, originally scheduled for 1:00 pm EST on Fox, was flexed into the 8:20 pm time slot on NBC's Sunday Night Football. The originally-scheduled NBC Sunday Night game between the San Diego–Cincinnati was changed to a 4:05 pm EST kickoff on CBS. The Seattle–Tampa Bay game was moved from 1:00 pm to 4:15 pm EST.
 The Minnesota-Philadelphia game was then postponed to Tuesday, December 28 at 8 pm due to public safety concerns resulting from an anticipated snowstorm in Philadelphia, even though no snow had fallen at the time of the postponement. The resulting game was the first Tuesday NFL game since 1946.
 By way of flexible scheduling, the following Week 17 games were changed:  The St. Louis-Seattle game, originally scheduled at 4:15 pm EST, was moved onto Sunday Night Football.  Also, the Jacksonville-Houston, Tennessee-Indianapolis, Chicago-Green Bay, Dallas-Philadelphia and New York Giants-Washington matches were all rescheduled from 1:00 pm to the 4:15 pm slot.  Except for Cowboys-Eagles, all these games carried playoff implications. (Per its flexible scheduling rules for Week 17, the league had to commit to move these games a full six days in advance before the aforementioned Week 16 Vikings-Eagles game eventually played out on that Tuesday night. Had Philadelphia won that game instead of Minnesota, they would have still been in contention for a first round playoff bye.)

Regular season standings

Division

Conference

Postseason

The 2010–11 NFL playoff tournament began January 8–9, 2011 with wild card weekend. Following that, the divisional playoffs set the matchups for the NFC Championship Game, to be played at 3:00 pm EST on January 23, and the AFC Championship Game, to be played at 6:30 pm EST.

After a backlash from players and critics about the previous season's Pro Bowl being played at Sun Life Stadium in Miami Gardens, Florida, in the contiguous United States, the 2011 Pro Bowl was played at Aloha Stadium in Halawa, Honolulu, Hawaii.
The date was January 30, 2011, the week before the Super Bowl. An NFL spokesman stated that "Plans for future Pro Bowls are not final." Indianapolis Colts President Bill Polian has stated his objections to the format, and is in favor of returning the game to after the Super Bowl as in previous years.

The annual Pro Bowl had previously been played in Hawaii for 30 consecutive seasons from 1980 to 2009. However, the NFL and State of Hawaii officials only agreed to a two-year deal to hold the Pro Bowl at Aloha Stadium in 2011 and 2012. This gives the option of playing the Pro Bowl in Hawaii on a rotational basis with the mainland, so it both maintains the traditional ties of holding it on the islands and providing accessibility to fans when played in the contiguous 48 states.

Super Bowl XLV, was held at Cowboys Stadium in Arlington, Texas, on February 6, 2011, and was the NFL's final event of the 2010 season.

Playoffs bracket

Super Bowl and conference logo, trophy changes
Starting with Super Bowl XLV, the template of all Super Bowl logos will virtually remain the same. The only differences from year to year will be the stadium backdrop and the Roman numerals for the game as well as colors of the area. For Super Bowl XLV, Cowboys Stadium is featured and "XLV" signifying the forty-fifth Super Bowl game.

The NFL also introduced new Lamar Hunt and George Halas trophies for the AFC and NFC Championship games. The trophies were changed from a brown base with an 'A' or 'N' on top of it surrounded by players layered on a frieze upon a wall, to silver trophies in the make of a football.  Additionally, both the NFC and AFC logos were revamped and recolored to reflect the current shield adopted two years earlier and with four stars running down the inside on both logos top to bottom from left to right instead of the six surrounding the AFC and three down the side of the NFC logo as each conference has four divisions. In addition, all event and playoff logos have undergone a complete makeover in a new logo system.

Records and milestones

Records
Passing
 Consecutive passes without an interception: 335, Tom Brady (Bernie Kosar, 308)
 Consecutive games with no interceptions, 2+ touchdowns: 9, Tom Brady (Don Meredith, 6)

Starts
 Consecutive starts by a quarterback: 297, Brett Favre
 Consecutive starts to start a career: 208, Peyton Manning (Gene Upshaw)

Turnovers
 Number of times sacked, career: 525, Brett Favre (John Elway, 516)
 Fumbles, career: 166, Brett Favre (Warren Moon, 161)
 Fewest turnovers by a team, season: 10, New England Patriots
 Most consecutive games without a turnover, 7, New England Patriots
 Most touchdown, fumbles recovered, own and opponents', season, 7, Arizona Cardinals (3 own, 4 opp)
 Most touchdown, own fumbles recovered, season, 3, Arizona Cardinals
 Most touchdown, opponents' fumbles recovered, season, 4, Arizona Cardinals

Special teams
 Kicks returned for touchdowns, career: 14, Devin Hester (Brian Mitchell, 13)
 Most touchdown, kickoff returns, team, game, 2 (tied), Seattle Seahawks (vs San Diego Chargers), September 26, 2010

Sacks
 Most sacks, single team, half, 9, New York Giants (vs Chicago Bears)
 Most combined sacks (both teams), half, 11, New York Giants (9) vs Chicago Bears (2), October 3, 2010

Playoff records
 Worst record to make the playoffs: 7–9, 2010 Seattle Seahawks (1982 Cleveland Browns and 1982 Detroit Lions, 4–5)
 Most playoff games won, all-time (tie): 33, Pittsburgh Steelers
 Most consecutive playoff games lost: 7, Kansas City Chiefs
 Team with the worst record to win 3 postseason games on the road, 10–6 (tied), Green Bay Packers

All-time records set or tied
 Most Super Bowl appearances, all-time, 8, Pittsburgh Steelers
 Most league championships, all-time, 13, Green Bay Packers
 Longest home game losing streak, 14 games, St. Louis Rams (2008–2010)
 Longest road game losing streak, 26 games, Detroit Lions (2007–2010)

Milestones and firsts
 Brett Favre became the first quarterback to throw for 70,000 career yards.
 Brett Favre became the first quarterback to throw for 500 career touchdowns.
 Brett Favre became the first quarterback to attempt 10,000 career passes.
 Brett Favre became the second non-kicker to play in 300 games (first was Jerry Rice).
 DeSean Jackson became the first player in NFL history to win a game by scoring on a punt return as time expired. 
 The Oakland Raiders became the first team since the 1970 AFL–NFL merger to go unbeaten in their division and miss the playoffs.
 The Seattle Seahawks became the first team to win a division with a losing record (7–9).
 The Seattle Seahawks became the first team to win a playoff game with a losing record.
 Defensive end Osi Umenyiora set the NFL record for forced fumbles in a season, with 10.
 The Green Bay Packers became the first team since the 1962 Detroit Lions to never trail a single game by more than 7 points at any time.
 The Tampa Bay Buccaneers became the first team since the merger to start 10 rookies and still complete a winning season (10–6). However, the Buccaneers missed the playoffs.

Regular season statistical leaders

Awards

All-Pro team

The following players were named All-Pro:

Players of the Week
The following were the players of the week during the 2010 season:

Regular season awards

Team superlatives

Offense
 Most points scored: New England, 518
 Fewest points scored: Carolina, 196
 Most total offensive yards: San Diego, 6,329
 Fewest total offensive yards: Carolina, 4,135
 Most total passing yards: Indianapolis, 4,609
 Fewest total passing yards: Carolina, 2,289
 Most rushing yards: Kansas City, 2,627
 Fewest rushing yards: Arizona, 1,388

Defense
 Fewest points allowed: Pittsburgh, 232
 Most points allowed: Denver, 471
 Fewest total yards allowed: San Diego, 4,345
 Most total yards allowed: Denver, 6,253
 Fewest passing yards allowed: San Diego, 2,845
 Most passing yards allowed: Houston, 4,280
 Fewest rushing yards allowed: Pittsburgh, 1,004
 Most rushing yards allowed: Buffalo, 2,714

Coaching changes

Pre-season

In-season

Stadiums

New Meadowlands Stadium opened in 2010, replacing Giants Stadium as the home of both the New York Giants and the New York Jets. The new stadium is located a few hundred feet away from the old building in the parking lot of Meadowlands Sports Complex in East Rutherford, New Jersey. Unlike Giants Stadium (in which the Giants were the sole NFL tenant until the 1984 season), the new Meadowlands Stadium will be a 50/50 partnership between both New York teams. The Giants played their first regular season game on September 12 against the Carolina Panthers, while the Jets played the following night against the Baltimore Ravens in the first game of a Monday Night Football doubleheader.

Arrowhead Stadium, home of the Kansas City Chiefs since 1972, underwent a two-year $375 million renovation project which was completed and unveiled in July 2010. The stadium hosted the second game of the Monday Night Football opening weekend doubleheader when the Chiefs played the San Diego Chargers.

M&T Bank Stadium, home of the Baltimore Ravens, installed FieldTurf prior to the 2010 season. The field had been Sportexe Momentum Turf since 2002 and grass before that.

Prior to Week 14, the inflatable roof of the Hubert H. Humphrey Metrodome, home of the Minnesota Vikings, buckled and tore as a result of heavy snowfall in Minneapolis, spilling snow onto Mall of America field and rendering the stadium unusable for the remainder of the Vikings' season. The Vikings' scheduled home game against the New York Giants was moved to Detroit's Ford Field and postponed to a 7:20 pm EST kickoff on Monday. Though stadium workers were initially "optimistic" that the roof could be repaired before the Vikings faced the Chicago Bears on December 20, stadium officials determined that such a repair was not possible in that time frame and the game was moved to TCF Bank Stadium.

Two stadiums received new naming rights: On January 20, LandShark Stadium, the home field of the Miami Dolphins, was renamed Sun Life Stadium. The Dolphins' home field, originally named Joe Robbie Stadium from 1987–1996, has undergone several name changes in its history, including Pro Player Stadium (1996–2005), Dolphin Stadium (2006–2009), and most recently, LandShark Stadium. On July 27, Jacksonville Municipal Stadium, the home field of the Jacksonville Jaguars, was renamed EverBank Field.

Uniforms
In the 2010 season, the Washington Redskins were the only team who made a major change to their main uniforms, wearing gold pants with their burgundy jerseys, and except for a game against the Packers, wore them for home games instead of their white jerseys and red pants. The white pants were not abandoned entirely, and were worn together with the burgundy jerseys for the two away games (and one home game) in which their opponent wore white at home. This was made possible with a sleeve modification, in which the broad yellow and white stripes were severely shrunken on an elastic band (same for white jerseys) so that when wearing the gold pants, the team also wore the retro style socks that had a different stripe pattern matching the sleeves of the day, so there is no longer a stripe design conflict.

The Green Bay Packers became the first team to officially unveil a third uniform for 2010, a throwback uniform based on their 1929 uniforms when they won their first NFL championship. The throwbacks are as accurate as possible while complying with current NFL guidelines, with a brown modern-shell helmet in place of the leather helmets of 1929, along with blue jerseys and gold circles with the jersey numbers nested within the circles, and brown pants. Like throwbacks worn in recent seasons by the San Diego Chargers, Dallas Cowboys, Buffalo Bills, New York Jets, and the archrival Minnesota Vikings, these throwbacks will be a permanent addition to the Packers uniforms, unlike throwbacks worn by the Detroit Lions and Pittsburgh Steelers that were intended as one-time deals but made permanent, as well as several one-shot throwbacks in recent years. The new Packers throwbacks replace the previous throwbacks (which comprised the current helmets with the "G" logo and stripes removed, white jerseys with plain green lettering, and tan pants) worn sporadically since the early 2000s (decade).

Also going the throwback route were the Chicago Bears, who harkened back to the Sid Luckman era with a 1940s set, replacing the pumpkin orange third jerseys, and the Indianapolis Colts, who will wear  throwbacks as well. The difference between the 2004 throwback and the 2010 throwback is the helmet color, which reverses the 2004 scheme.

The Philadelphia Eagles have adopted their  championship uniforms that were worn September 12 against the Packers, the team they beat to win their last championship in celebration of the 50th anniversary of that game.

The Tennessee Titans returned to using navy blue jerseys as their third jersey, after a one-year hiatus in which they wore light blue Houston Oilers throwback jerseys in celebration of the 50th anniversary of the American Football League, but did not wear them for any game in 2010.

The Pittsburgh Steelers wore their throwbacks against the Cleveland Browns on October 17 and against the New England Patriots on November 14.

The Seattle Seahawks have retired the neon green uniform worn for one game in  against Chicago, which was in turn an offshoot from an April Fools' Day joke written about by Uni Watch founder Paul Lukas that year.

Media

This is the fifth season under the television contracts with the league's television partners: CBS (all AFC Sunday afternoon away games and one Thanksgiving game), Fox (all NFC Sunday afternoon away games and one Thanksgiving game), NBC (17 Sunday night games and the kickoff game), ESPN (17 Monday night games over sixteen weeks), NFL Network (eight late-season games on Thursday and Saturday nights, including one Thanksgiving game), and DirecTV's NFL Sunday Ticket package. These contracts ran through at least 2013. 

Joe Theismann joined Bob Papa and Matt Millen in a three-man booth for NFL Network, while Keith Olbermann left his position as co-host of NBC's Football Night in America.

In national radio, this is the second year on Westwood One's most recent contract extension.  The network also agreed to a four-year extension on December 23, 2010.

Nielsen Ratings for the fall 2010 television season have shown viewership increases of up to 10 percent for most of the NFL's broadcast partners; eighteen of the twenty most watched television broadcasts of the season have so far been NFL games.

References

External links 
 2010 NFL season at ESPN
 Football Outsiders 2010 DVOA Ratings
 

 
National Football League
National Football League seasons
NFL